Thicknesse is an English surname. Notable people with the surname include:

Cuthbert Thicknesse (1887–1971), Dean of St Albans
Francis Thicknesse (1829–1921), Bishop suffragan of Leicester
George Thicknesse, 19th Baron Audley (1758–1818), English peer
Norman Thicknesse (1858–1946), Archdeacon of Middlesex
Philip Thicknesse (1719–1792), English writer
Ralph Thicknesse (1768–1842), British politician
Ralph Anthony Thicknesse (1800–1854), British politician
Viv Thicknesse (1910–1986), Australian rugby league and rugby union player

English-language surnames